Burhaniye is a town and district of Balıkesir Province in the Aegean region of Turkey.

Burhaniye may also refer to:

 Burhaniye (Metrobus), a station on the Istanbul Metrobus Bus rapid transit line
 Burhaniye, Kestel, a village in the Kestel district of Bursa Province, Turkey
 Burhaniye, Üsküdar, a neighborhood in Üsküdar district of Istanbul, Turkey
 Burhaniye, Vezirköprü, a village in Vezirköprü district of Samsun Province, Turkey

See also
 Burhan (disambiguation)
 Burhaniyya